The 2001–02 season was Manchester City Football Club's 110th season playing in a division of English football, most of which have been spent in the top flight.
This season was the club's most recent season of second-tier league football, with the team playing in the Football League First Division following its immediate relegation from the Premier League in the previous season after its promotion the season before that.  This time around the team was promoted at the first time of asking, with it winning the First Division by a clear 10 points while scoring more than 100 league goals for the first time since the 1957–58 season.

Season review
The team's performance in the First Division this season matched a number of prior club records whilst also setting some new ones. The team equaled the record number of total goals scored (108) in any prior season; set a new club high for total league points accumulated (99) in a single season (since 3 points for a win was introduced into English football);  produced the highest number of seasonal wins (31); and equaled the club's prior record for the total number of home wins (19). Additionally, Manchester City's First Division championship title became a record seventh English second-tier title won by the club, a record still to be surpassed by any other English team. Shaun Goater, the club's leading goal scorer this campaign with a tally of 32 goals - making him the first City player since Francis Lee in 1972 to net more than 30 goals in a season - scored 28 of those in the club's pursuit of promotion back to the top flight, which meant that he was also the leading goal scorer in the First Division this season.

Team kit
The team kit was produced by Le Coq Sportif and the shirt sponsor was Eidos Interactive.

Historical league performance
Prior to this season, the history of Manchester City's performance in the English football league hierarchy since the creation of the Premier League in 1992 is summarised by the following timeline chart – which commences with the last season (1991–92) of the old Football League First Division (from which the Premier League was formed).

Games

Football League First Division

Position in final standings

Results summary

Points breakdown 
Points at home: 60 
Points away from home: 39 
6 points: Barnsley, Birmingham City, Bradford City, Burnley, Crewe Alexandra,
Gillingham, Grimsby Town, Millwall, Sheffield Wednesday, Watford,
Wolverhampton Wanderers
4 points: Nottingham Forest, Rotherham United, Sheffield United, Walsall
3 points: Coventry City, Crystal Palace, Norwich City, Portsmouth, Preston N. End 
1 point: Stockport County, West Bromwich Albion
0 points: Wimbledon

Biggest & smallest 
Biggest home wins: 5–1 vs. Burnley, 29 December 2001  &  vs. Barnsley, 6 April 2002 
   4–0 vs. Grimsby Town, 23 October 2001  &  vs. Sheffield Wednesday, 27 Feb. 2002 
Biggest home defeat: 0–4 vs. Wimbledon, 1 October 2001 
Biggest away win: 2–6 vs. Sheffield Wednesday, 22 September 2001 
Biggest away defeat: 4–0 vs. West Bromwich Albion, 8 September 2001 

Biggest home attendance: 34,657 vs. Portsmouth, 21 April 2002 
Smallest home attendance: 30,238 vs. Millwall, 30 January 2002 
Biggest away attendance: 28,266 vs. Nottingham Forest, 28 October 2001 
Smallest away attendance: 7,618 vs. Walsall, 23 February 2002

Results by round

Individual match reports

League Cup

Second round

Third round

Fourth round

FA Cup

Third round

Fourth round

Fifth round

Playing statistics
Appearances for competitive matches only

Information current as of 21 April 2002 (end of season)

Goal scorers

All competitions

Football League Division 1

League Cup

FA Cup 

Information current as of 21 April 2002 (end of season)

See also
Manchester City F.C. seasons

References

Manchester City F.C. seasons
Manchester City